Pietro Balestra (April 2, 1935 – June 23, 2005) was a Swiss economist specializing in econometrics. He was born in Lugano and earned a B.A. in economics from the University of Fribourg. Balestra moved for graduate work to the University of Kansas (M.A in Economics) and Stanford University. He was awarded the Ph.D. in Economics by Stanford University in 1965.

Balestra returned to Switzerland as Professor of Economics and Econometrics at the University of Fribourg. He was also Associate Professor of Economics at the University of Dijon. In 1980 he was called to chair the Department of Econometrics at the University of Geneva.

Balestra continued to be active in his retirement years. He taught at the University of Lugano until his death.

Balestra his noted for his contributions to the econometrics of dynamic error components models, in particular for the generalized least squares estimator known as the Balestra–Nerlove estimator. Balestra was one of the initiators of the foundation of the University of Lugano. His outside connections were critical in gathering support from the Swiss science council. He was the first dean of the faculty of economics.

As the first treasurer of the European Economic Association, Balestra was instrumental in gathering financial support for this Pan-European scientific society.

Honours 
 Fellow the Econometric Society 
 Fellow of the Journal of Econometrics
 President of the Swiss society for economics and statistics

Major publications

References 

1935 births
2005 deaths
Swiss economists
University of Kansas alumni
Stanford University School of Humanities and Sciences alumni
Academic staff of the University of Geneva
Econometricians
People from Lugano
Academic staff of the University of Lugano
University of Burgundy alumni
Fellows of the Econometric Society